In Mandaeism, Bil or Bel is the Mandaic name for the planet Jupiter. Bil is one of the seven planets, who are part of the entourage of Ruha in the World of Darkness.

Bil, who is also called Angʿil, is associated with masculinity and also with hotness and moistness (see also four temperaments). Bil's name is derived from the Akkadian Bēlu.

References

Planets in Mandaeism
Jupiter in culture